Mount Gevers is a rock peak,  high, in the Hays Mountains of the Queen Maud Mountains of Antarctica, standing at the north side of Cappellari Glacier at the point where it enters Amundsen Glacier. It was mapped by the United States Geological Survey from surveys and U.S. Navy air photos, 1960–64, and was named by the Advisory Committee on Antarctic Names for T.W. Gevers of the University of the Witwatersrand (Johannesburg), a geologist at McMurdo Station in 1964–65.

References

Mountains of the Ross Dependency
Amundsen Coast